Alex Richards may refer to:
 Alex Richards (cricketer)
 Alex Richards (journalist)